Ljanselva is a river in Oslo, Norway. It flows from Lutvann and Nøklevann and mouth into Bunnefjorden at Fiskevollbukta. Several saw mills were located along Ljanselva. The lower part of the river is a protected cultural site.

References

Rivers of Oslo
Rivers of Norway